Janusz "John" Kowalik (born 26 March 1944) is a Polish former association football striker who scored prolifically in both the European leagues and the North American Soccer League. He was the 1968 NASL MVP.

Player

Club career
Kowalik was born in Nowy Sącz. In 1968, the owners of the Chicago Mustangs of the North American Soccer League (NASL) signed Kowalik. That season, he led the league in scoring with thirty goals in twenty-eight games. This led to his selection as the league MVP and a first team All Star. At the end of the season, he moved to the California Clippers. However, the NASL lost most of its teams with all west coast teams, but the Clippers, folding. The Clippers decided to leave the NASL, join a local league and exist on playing exhibition games against foreign teams. In January 1969, the team ownership decided to cease operations.

In 1969, Kowalik returned to Europe where he signed with Sparta Rotterdam of the Dutch Eredivisie. In 1974, he moved to NEC for one season.

Kowalik returned to the NASL with the Chicago Sting in 1975, where he played fourteen games, scoring nine goals in 1976.

He then returned to the Netherlands to play with MVV Maastricht.

In 1977, he returned to the Sting where he scored only one goal in an unknown number of games.

In the 1978–79 season he returned to MVV.

International career
He was capped 6 times for the Polish national team.

Coach
Kowalik later coached Vitesse Arnhem, Górnik Zabrze and Rangers International of Enugu.

References

External links
 NASL stats
 
 Janusz Kowalik at Voetbal International 
 

Living people
1944 births
Sportspeople from Nowy Sącz
Association football forwards
Polish footballers
Poland international footballers
MKS Cracovia (football) players
Chicago Mustangs (1967–68) players
Oakland Clippers players
Sparta Rotterdam players
NEC Nijmegen players
Chicago Sting (NASL) players
MVV Maastricht players
K. Patro Eisden Maasmechelen players
Ekstraklasa players
North American Soccer League (1968–1984) players
Eredivisie players
Eerste Divisie players
Polish expatriate footballers
Polish expatriate sportspeople in the United States
Expatriate soccer players in the United States
Polish expatriate sportspeople in the Netherlands
Expatriate footballers in the Netherlands
Polish expatriate sportspeople in Belgium
Expatriate footballers in Belgium
Expatriate football managers in Belgium
Polish football managers
Polish expatriate football managers
K. Patro Eisden Maasmechelen managers
Górnik Zabrze managers
K.R.C. Genk managers
Expatriate football managers in the Netherlands